Hamaas (HaMa'as) was a weekly publication of the Lehi, an armed Zionist militant group in Mandatory Palestine. Other publications by the Lehi included the daily Mivrak, the monthly HeHahzit, and BaMahteret.

The publication first came to public attention in July 1946 after the report of the Anglo-American Committee of Inquiry and a British Colonial Office White Paper identified an article in the second issue indicating that a Lehi attack on the Haifa Oil Refinery on the night of 31 October/1 November 1945 had been coordinated with other attacks on the same night by the Haganah (on railways), the Irgun (on Lydda railway station) and the Palmach (on two British coast guard vessels in Haifa harbour) under the overall direction of the Jewish Agency. Hamaas noted,

The events of 1 November have given a striking expression of the firm resolution of the Jews to fight for the freedom of their homeland. The scope of the attack has proved that the Jews are capable of acting under the most difficult conditions.

However the most significant achievement on that night was that for the first time the attack was coordinated and concentrated. The Jewish Resistance Movement has embraced all the Jewish resistance forces with a view to their being guided by a single authority which would control the common fight. (Hamaas, Issue No. 2., November 1945).
In addition to the Hamaas article the British government published intercepted telegrams between the Jewish Agency in Jerusalem and Zionist leaders in London that demonstrated Jewish Agency control over the formal organisation established by the Haganah, Irgun and Lehi to coordinate their actions, which was known as the Tenuat Hameri (United Resistance Movement).

During the operations mentioned by Hamaas the Haganah planted 500 explosive devices causing 242 breaks in the railway lines, and damaged the stationmasters office in Jerusalem, a telephone installation on the Jerusalem-Lydda line, and a petrol wagon in the Tel Aviv railway yard. The Irgun attack at Lydda destroyed one locomotive and damaged six others. In the Lehi attack on Consolidated Refineries in Haifa one Lehi operative, Moishele Bar Giora, was killed in a premature explosion and another, Abraham Yehudai, was badly wounded.

The operations were publicised by the illegal Haganah underground radio station Kol Yisrael. The Mandate authorities and the British government in London were outraged by the intensity of the violence and mobilised additional military forces.

Notes

References
Bowyer Bell, John (1996). Terror out of Zion: the Fight for Israeli Independence. Transaction Publishers. 
Great Britain, Colonial Office (1946). Palestine: Statement of Information Relating to Acts of Violence, July 1946, Cmd. 6873. London: His Majesty's Stationery Office.
Khalidi, Walid. (1971). From Haven to Conquest: Readings in Zionism and the Palestine Problem Until 1948. Institute of Palestine Studies. 
Rapoport, David C. (2006). Terrorism: The Second or Anti-colonial Wave. Taylor and Francis. 

Lehi (militant group)
Mass media in Mandatory Palestine
Publications established in the 1940s
1940s establishments in Mandatory Palestine